The Hot Springs Music Festival is a not-for-profit educational music festival held in Hot Springs, Arkansas. During the first two weeks of June, "pre-professional" musicians join professional mentor musicians in performance of concert music. There are approximately 4 orchestral concerts and numerous chamber music concerts. Venues include the Oaklawn Performing Arts School and various churches in the city.  All rehearsals are open to the public.

The Festival Board includes 6 Mentors: Caroline Kinsey, Chair; Matt McClung, Secretary; Osiris Molina, Treasurer; Annie Chalex Boyle, Virginia Broffitt Kunzer and Scott Moore; also David Childs, Vice Chair; Janet Brewer, Lisa Carey, Christy Etheridge and Mara Magdalene.

Founder Laura S. Rosenberg continues to serve as Operations Manager and Arts Administration Mentor.   

Since its inaugural season in 1996, the Hot Springs Music Festival has mentored more than 1600 apprentices.  The Festival offers apprenticeships in each of the orchestral instruments as well as collaborative piano, voice, conducting, production, recording engineering, and arts administration.  Festival apprentices come from all over the world and are evaluated competitively against other applicants.  Each accepted apprentice receives a full tuition scholarship for the two-week festival.

The Hot Springs Music Festival Symphony Orchestra  has recorded six discs on the Naxos Records label.  They also appear on four additional compilation discs, also on the Naxos label.

The dates for the 2022 season are June 4–18.

Every year approximately 10,000 people attend the festival to watch 20 concerts and 250 rehearsals. Additionally, around 6.4 million people tune in to listen to this festival via radio. The festival is held in the Ouachita Mountains, in Hot Springs National Park, Arkansas. This national park is now designated a "city of the arts".

References

External links
 Hot Springs Music Festival

Music festivals in Arkansas
Classical music festivals in the United States